A gibbet  is any instrument of public execution (including guillotine, executioner's block, impalement stake, hanging gallows, or related scaffold). Gibbeting is the use of a gallows-type structure from which the dead or dying bodies of criminals were hanged on public display to deter other existing or potential criminals. Occasionally, the gibbet was also used as a method of execution, with the criminal being left to die of exposure, thirst and/or starvation. The practice of placing a criminal on display within a gibbet is also called "hanging in chains".

Display 

Gibbeting was a common law punishment, which a judge could impose in addition to execution. This practice was regularized in England by the Murder Act 1751, which empowered judges to impose this for murder. It was most often used for traitors, murderers, highwaymen, pirates, and sheep stealers and was intended to discourage others from committing similar offenses. The structures were therefore often placed next to public highways (frequently at crossroads) and waterways.

Exhibiting a body could backfire against a monarch, especially if the monarch was unpopular. The rebels Henry of Montfort and Henry of Wylynton, enemies of Edward II, were drawn and hanged before being exhibited on a gibbet near Bristol. However, the people made relics of these bloody and mutilated remains out of respect and later used the relics in violent protest. Miracles were even reported at the spot where the bodies were hanging.

Although the intention was deterrence, the public response was complex. Samuel Pepys expressed disgust at the practice. There was Christian objection that prosecution of criminals should end with their death. The sight and smell of decaying corpses was offensive and regarded as "pestilential", so it was seen as a threat to public health.

Pirates were sometimes executed by hanging on a gibbet erected close to the low-water mark by the sea or a tidal section of a river. Their bodies would be left dangling until they had been submerged by the tide three times. In London, Execution Dock is located on the north bank of the River Thames in Wapping; after tidal immersion, particularly notorious criminals' bodies could be hung in cages a little farther downstream at either Cuckold's Point or Blackwall Point, as a warning to other waterborne criminals of the possible consequences of their actions (such a fate befell Captain William Kidd in May 1701). There were objections that these displays offended foreign visitors and did not uphold the reputation of the law, though the scenes even became gruesome tourist attractions.

Variants 
In some cases, the bodies would be left until their clothes rotted or even until the bodies were almost completely decomposed, after which the bones would be scattered.

In cases of drawing and quartering, the body of the criminal was cut into four or five portions, with the several parts often gibbeted in different places.

So that the public display might be prolonged, bodies were sometimes coated in tar or bound in chains. Sometimes, body-shaped iron cages were used to contain the decomposing corpses. For example, in March 1743 in the town of Rye, East Sussex, Allen Grebell was murdered by John Breads. Breads was imprisoned in the Ypres Tower and then hanged, after which his body was left to rot for more than 20 years in an iron cage on Gibbet Marsh. The cage, with Breads's skull clamped within the headframe, is still kept in the town hall.

Another example of the cage variation is the gibbet iron, on display at the Atwater Kent Museum in Philadelphia, Pennsylvania. The cage, created in 1781, was intended to be used to display the body of convicted pirate Thomas Wilkinson, so that sailors on passing ships might be warned of the consequences of piracy; Wilkinson's planned execution never took place, so the gibbet was never used.

An example of an iron cage used to string up bodies on a gibbet can still be seen in the Westgate Museum at Winchester.

Historical examples

Antiquity 
The Old Testament (Torah) law forbids gibbeting beyond sundown of the day that the body is hanged on the tree. Public crucifixion with prolonged display of the body after death can be seen as a form of gibbeting. Gibbeting was one of the methods said by Tacitus and Cassius Dio to have been used by Boudica's army in the massacre of Roman settlers in the destruction of Camulodunum (Colchester), Londinium (London) and Verulamium (St. Albans) in AD 60–61.

Bermuda 
During the 17th and 18th centuries, gibbets were a common sight in Bermuda. Located in Smith's Parish at the entrance to Flatt's Inlet is Gibbet Island, which was used to hang the bodies of escaped slaves as a deterrent to others. The small island was used for this purpose because it was not on the mainland and therefore satisfied the beliefs of locals who did not want gibbets near their homes.

Canada 

Marie-Josephte Corriveau (1733–1763), better known as "La Corriveau", is one of the most popular figures in Québécois folklore. She lived in New France, was sentenced to death by a British military court martial for the murder of her second husband, was hanged for it, and her body hung in chains. Her story has become legendary in Quebec, and she is the subject of numerous books and plays.

During the Napoleonic Wars, the Royal Navy used Hangman's Beach on McNab's Island in Halifax Harbour to display the hanged bodies of deserters, in order to deter the crews of passing warships.

Colony of New South Wales 
A rocky outcrop not far into Port Jackson – originally called Mat-te-wan-ye in the local Aboriginal language, later renamed Rock Island by Governor Arthur Phillip but today known as Pinchgut Island and the location of Fort Denison – was a gibbeting site. It took its name after a convict, Thomas Hill, was sentenced to a week on the rock in iron chains sustained by only bread and water; the conditions literally pinched his gut, hence the name. The rock was levelled in the 1790s, and a gibbet installed in 1796. Francis Morgan, transported for life to New South Wales after being convicted of murder in 1793, killed again in 1796 and was hanged in chains on Pinchgut in November 1796. His dead body, later a skeleton, remained on display on the island for four years.

England 

The head of Oliver Cromwell was displayed on a spike after his death, after monarchists disinterred his body during the restoration of the monarchy.

Robert Aske, who led the rebellion against Henry VIII known as Pilgrimage of Grace, was hanged in chains in 1537.

Germany

The leaders of the Anabaptist movement in Münster were executed in 1536; their dead bodies were gibbeted in iron cages hanging from the steeple of St. Lambert's Church, and the cages are still on display there today. Similarly, following his execution by hanging in 1738, the corpse of Jewish financier Joseph Süß Oppenheimer was gibbeted in a human-sized bird cage that hung outside of Stuttgart on the so-called Pragsattel (the public execution place at the time) for six years, until the inauguration of Karl Eugen, Duke of Württemberg, who permitted the hasty burial of his corpse at an unknown location.

The Netherlands (by Englishmen) 
After the siege and capture of the city of Zutphen in 1591 by the Anglo-Dutch army the English dug up the body of the former English commander Rowland York and hanged and gibbeted it as a reminder of York's treachery in 1587. He had handed over the Zutphen sconce to the Spaniards after the English army under the Earl of Leicester was defeated by the Spaniards in the Battle of Zutphen.

Iran 
In 838, the Iranian hero Babak Khorramdin had his hands and feet cut off by the Abbasid Caliphate and was then gibbeted alive while sewn into a cow's skin with the horns at ear level to crush his head gradually as the skin dried out.

Malta
On 4 February 1820, six British pirates were hanged on their vessel in the middle of the harbour at Valletta. Thereafter, their bodies were hung in gibbets erected at the bastions of Fort Ricolli.

United States 
During the colonial era, Bird Island and Nix's Mate island in Boston Harbor were used for gibbeting pirates and sailors executed for crimes in Massachusetts. Their bodies were left hanging as a warning to sailors coming into the harbor and approaching Boston. In 1755, a slave named Mark was hanged in Cambridge, Massachusetts and then gibbeted in chains in Charlestown, Massachusetts; twenty years later, Paul Revere passed the remains of Mark on his famous ride.

Six men were executed by gibbeting under civil authority in the Southern Colonies. In Virginia, three men accused of piracy were executed by gibbeting in 1700. In South Carolina, three men were executed by gibbeting: one accused of poisoning in 1744, and two accused of murder in 1754 and 1759. There have been no recorded executions by this method under the authority of the United States.

After independence, a gang of Cuban pirates was gibbeted in New York .

Last recorded gibbetings

Afghanistan 
The January 1921 issue of National Geographic Magazine contains two photographs of gibbet cages, referenced as "man-cages," in use in Afghanistan. Commentary included with the photograph indicates that the gibbet was a practice still in active use. Persons sentenced to death were placed alive in the cage and remained there until some undefined time weeks or months after their deaths.

Australia 
In 1837, five years after the practice had ceased in England, the body of John McKay was gibbeted near the spot where he had murdered Joseph Wilson near Perth, Tasmania. There was a great outcry, but the body was not removed until an acquaintance of Wilson passed the spot and, horrified by the spectacle of McKay's rotting corpse, pleaded with the authorities to remove it. The place where this occurred was just to the right (when travelling towards Launceston, not to be confused with the private road with the same name) on the Midlands Highway on the northern side of Perth. It is the last case of gibbetting in a British colony.

United Kingdom 

The Murder Act 1751 stipulated that "in no case whatsoever shall the body of any murderer be suffered to be buried"; the cadaver was either to be publicly dissected or left "hanging in chains". The use of gibbeting had been in decline for some years before it was formally repealed by statute in 1834. In Scotland, the final case of gibbeting was that of Alexander Gillan in 1810. The last two men gibbeted in England were William Jobling and James Cook, both in 1832. Their cases are good examples of the changing attitudes toward the practice.

William Jobling was a miner hanged and gibbeted for the murder of Nicholas Fairles, a colliery owner and local magistrate, near Jarrow, Durham. After being hanged, the body was taken off the rope and loaded into a cart and taken on a tour of the area before arriving at Jarrow Slake, where the crime had been committed. Here, the body was placed into an iron gibbet cage. The cage and the scene were described thus:

The post was fixed into a  stone base sunk into the Slake. The body was soon removed by fellow miners and given a decent burial.

James Cook was a bookbinder convicted of the murder of his creditor Paas, a manufacturer of brass instruments, in Leicester. During an attempted robbery, Cook beat Paas to death, and then took the body to his home, where he cut it into pieces and burned it to try to hide the evidence of the crime. He was executed on Friday, 10 August 1832, in front of Leicester prison. Afterwards:

According to The Newgate Calendar:

Although the practice of gibbeting had been abandoned by 1834 in Britain, during the British Raj of India in 1843, Charles James Napier threatened to have such structures built in parallel to any attempt to practice Sati, the ritualized burning of widows, to execute the perpetrators.

In popular culture
Works of art depicting gibbeting include:
The second movement of composer Maurice Ravel's piano suite Gaspard de la nuit, based on the poems of Aloysius Bertrand.
The 2006 film Pirates of the Caribbean: Dead Man's Chest features a prisoner in a gibbet in one of the opening scenes, where he is graphically pecked to death by crows.
In the 1988 fantasy classic Willow, Val Kilmer's character Madmartigan is suspended in a "crow cage" at the beginning of the film. 
Crow cages and other forms of gibbeting are shown in the 1982 film Conan the Barbarian.

See also 
 Dule tree
 Pillory
 Gibbet of Montfaucon

Citations and references 
Citations

References
 

Execution methods
Death customs
Execution equipment
Capital punishment
Public executions